The 1996 Pepsi 400 was the 15th stock car race of the 1996 NASCAR Winston Cup Series and the 38th iteration of the event. The race was held on Saturday, July 6, 1996, in Daytona Beach, Florida at Daytona International Speedway, a 2.5 miles (4.0 km) permanent triangular-shaped superspeedway. The race was shortened from its scheduled 160 laps to 117 laps due to rain. After suffering an ignition failure in the middle of the race, Morgan–McClure Motorsports driver Sterling Marlin was able to come back through the field and dominate a majority of the race when the race ended due to the race. The win was Marlin's sixth career NASCAR Winston Cup Series victory and his second and final victory of the season. To fill out the top three, Terry Labonte and Jeff Gordon, both drivers for Hendrick Motorsports, would finish second and third, respectively.

Background 

Daytona International Speedway is one of three superspeedways to hold NASCAR races, the other two being Indianapolis Motor Speedway and Talladega Superspeedway. The standard track at Daytona International Speedway is a four-turn superspeedway that is 2.5 miles (4.0 km) long. The track's turns are banked at 31 degrees, while the front stretch, the location of the finish line, is banked at 18 degrees.

Entry list 

 (R) denotes rookie driver.

Qualifying 
Qualifying was split into two rounds. The first round was scheduled to be held on Thursday, July 4, at 2:30 PM EST. However, only nine drivers were able to set a lap before qualifying was rained out and postponed until Friday, July 5, at 9:00 AM EST. Each driver would have two laps to set a time, the fastest of which would count as their qualifying lap. During the first round, the top 25 drivers in the round would be guaranteed a starting spot in the race. If a driver was not able to guarantee a spot in the first round, they had the option to scrub their time from the first round and try and run a faster lap time in a second round qualifying run, held on Friday, July 5, at 1:00 PM EST. As with the first round, each driver would have two laps to set a time. For this specific race, positions 26-38 would be decided on time, and depending on who needed it, a select amount of positions were given to cars who had not otherwise qualified but were high enough in owner's points.

No drivers would fail to qualify.

Full qualifying results

Race results

References 

1996 NASCAR Winston Cup Series
NASCAR races at Daytona International Speedway
July 1996 sports events in the United States
1996 in sports in Florida